The 1887 Ramsey by-election was held on 30 August 1887.  The by-election triggered upon succession of William Fellowes to the peerage as Baron de Ramsey.  The seat was retained by the Conservative candidate Ailwyn Edward Fellowes.

References 

By-elections to the Parliament of the United Kingdom in Cambridgeshire constituencies
Politics of Huntingdonshire
August 1887 events
1887 elections in the United Kingdom
1887 in England
19th century in Huntingdonshire